Ben T. Epps (February 20, 1888, Oconee County, Georgia - October 16, 1937), known as "Georgia's First Aviator" was an American aviation pioneer. In 1907, he built a monoplane of his own design, now known as the Epps 1909 Monoplane. This was followed by other original monoplane and biplane designs in 1909, 1910, 1911, 1912, 1916, 1924 and 1930. He died of injuries as a result of an airplane crash. Athens-Ben Epps Airport is named in his honor. In 1989 he was inducted into the inaugural class of the Georgia Aviation Hall of Fame.

Aircraft designs
Between 1907 and 1930, Epps designed and built eight aircraft:

 Epps 1909 Monoplane
 Epps 1909 Monoplane
 Epps 1910 Monoplane
 Epps 1911 Monoplane
 Epps 1912 Monoplane
 Epps 1916 Biplane
 Epps 1924 Monoplane
 Epps 1930 Biplane

References

External links
Ben T. Epps (1888-1937) from the New Georgia Encyclopedia
Ben Epps historical marker
First Flight in Georgia historical marker

1888 births
1937 deaths
20th-century American businesspeople
Aviators from Georgia (U.S. state)
Aviation pioneers
Aircraft designers
Georgia Tech alumni
People from Oconee County, Georgia